Roger Davis (October 2, 1762November 20, 1815) was a member of the U.S. House of Representatives from Pennsylvania.

Roger Davis was born in Charlestown Village in the Province of Pennsylvania.  He studied medicine at the University of Pennsylvania and commenced practice about 1785 in Charlestown.  He was a member of the Pennsylvania House of Representatives from 1809 to 1811.

Davis was elected as a Republican to the Twelfth and Thirteenth Congresses.  He resumed the practice of medicine in Charlestown, where he died in 1815, and was interred in Great Valley Presbyterian Churchyard.

Sources

The Political Graveyard

1762 births
1815 deaths
Members of the Pennsylvania House of Representatives
Perelman School of Medicine at the University of Pennsylvania alumni
Politicians from Philadelphia
Physicians from Pennsylvania
American Presbyterians
Democratic-Republican Party members of the United States House of Representatives from Pennsylvania